Interstate 5 (I-5) in the U.S. state of Oregon is a major Interstate Highway that traverses the state from north to south. It travels to the west of the Cascade Mountains, connecting Portland to Salem, Eugene, Medford, and other major cities in the Willamette Valley and across the northern Siskiyou Mountains. The highway runs  from the California state line near Ashland to the Washington state line in northern Portland, forming the central part of Interstate 5's route between Mexico and Canada.

I-5 was designated in 1957 and replaced U.S. Route 99 (US 99) for most of its length, itself preceded by the Pacific Highway and various wagon roads. The freeway incorporated early bypasses and expressways built for US 99 in the 1950s, including a new freeway route from Portland to Salem, and additional bypasses were built using federal funds. The last segment of I-5, on the Marquam Bridge in Portland, was opened in October 1966 and the whole highway was dedicated later that month. The freeway remains parallel or concurrent to Oregon Route 99 (OR 99) and its spur routes, running along former segments of US 99 that were bypassed by I-5, from Ashland to Portland.

Under Oregon's named route system, all of I-5 is designated as Pacific Highway No. 1. The Salem–Portland section was named the Baldock Freeway until 2022. The freeway also has three signed auxiliary routes that function as spurs and bypasses of major cities: I-105 in Eugene, I-205 in eastern Portland, I-405 in downtown Portland. Two additional auxiliary routes were planned in the early years of the Interstate system, but were shelved after local opposition.

Route description

The highway connects several of the state's largest metropolitan areas, which lie in the Rogue and Willamette valleys, and passes through counties with approximately 81 percent of Oregon's population. As a component of the Interstate Highway System, I-5 is also designated as an important highway under the National Highway System. It is officially designated under Oregon's named route system as the Pacific Highway No. 1, a name shared with Oregon Route 99 (OR 99) and its split routes north of Junction City. OR 99 runs concurrent to I-5 through most of southern Oregon, splitting from the freeway to serve city centers and use other alternate routes, while OR 99W and OR 99E serve corridors on opposite sides of the Willamette River. The state legislature also designated I-5 as the Purple Heart Trail and Korean War Veterans Memorial Highway in 2015.

I-5 is maintained by the Oregon Department of Transportation (ODOT), who conduct an annual survey of traffic volume that is expressed in terms of average annual daily traffic (AADT), a measure of traffic volume for any average day of the year. The highway's busiest section is near Durham between junctions with I-205 and OR 217, carrying 164,000 vehicles in 2017. The least-traveled section of I-5 is located near Ashland and carries only 16,600 vehicles.

California to Eugene

I-5 enters Oregon at the California state line in southern Jackson County. The mountainous,  section of the freeway runs along Siskiyou Pass and includes several runaway truck ramps and chain-up areas due to its heavy use by trucks and its foggy and snowy conditions in winter. North of the summit, the freeway intersects the Old Siskiyou Highway (OR 273) and the Pacific Crest Trail before it travels out of the Rogue River–Siskiyou National Forest.

The highway descends from the mountains into the Rogue Valley and intersects the south end of OR 99 west of Emigrant Lake, adjacent to a railroad underpass. I-5 follows OR 99 and passes a rest area and welcome center before entering the city of Ashland. The freeway crosses OR 66 west of the city's municipal airport and follows Bear Creek around the north side of downtown Ashland. I-5 and OR 99 run parallel each other on opposite sides of Bear Creek through Talent and Phoenix to Medford, at the center of the Rogue Valley and its winery region. The freeway runs through downtown Medford on a  elevated viaduct with no exits to the city center. It then intersects OR 62 at the Rogue Valley Mall, providing access to Crater Lake and Mount McLoughlin northeast of the valley. The freeway continues northwest, passing Rogue Valley International–Medford Airport and the suburb of Central Point before turning west to follow the Rogue River.

I-5 follows the Rogue River downstream through a narrow valley, where OR 99 and a railroad cross over and under the freeway several times, and passes Valley of the Rogue State Park. It also passes the Oregon Vortex, a popular roadside attraction near Gold Hill. At the west end of the valley in Josephine County, the freeway reaches Grants Pass and intersects U.S. Route 199 (US 199), which connects to Crescent City, California, on the Pacific Coast. The freeway continues along the northeast edge of Grants Pass and becomes concurrent with OR 99 at an interchange north of the city. I-5 splits from the Rogue River and continues north along a zig-zag course across several passes and valleys in the Southern Oregon Coast Range. At Wolf Creek, it passes a historic inn and tavern that is listed on the National Register of Historic Places. The freeway crosses into Douglas County near Stage Road Pass east of Glendale and turns northeast to follow the Cow Creek valley before resuming its northern course through the mountains. After descending from Canyon Creek Pass and following Canyon Creek, I-5 reaches Canyonville and passes the Seven Feathers Casino Resort. The freeway follows the South Umpqua River through Myrtle Creek and the Cow Creek Reservation, with OR 99 splitting to serve Winston. I-5 intersects OR 42 east of Winston in Green and continues north into the outskirts of Roseburg.

Within Roseburg, the freeway runs along the west bank of the South Umpqua River opposite from the city's downtown and passes through several residential neighborhoods near the regional airport. OR 99 rejoins I-5 between Oakland and Yoncalla in the Cabin Creek canyon, but splits off again to serve the Pass Creek valley while I-5 remains in the Pleasant Valley. The two highways are rejoined at Anlauf and continue northeast along Pass Creek towards Cottage Grove in Lane County. The freeway runs through the eastern outskirts of Cottage Grove and continues north along the Coast Fork Willamette River into the Willamette Valley, trading the mountainous terrain of southern Oregon for rolling hills and farms. At Goshen, I-5 intersects OR 58 and passes the Lane Community College campus before entering Eugene.

Eugene to Wilsonville

I-5 continues north into Eugene, running along the city's eastern border with Springfield, and intersects OR 225 at Coryell Pass. OR 99 then splits from the freeway travels west along OR 126 Business into downtown Eugene, serving the University of Oregon campus, and continues north to Junction City, where it splits into OR 99W and OR 99E. On the north side of the river near the Gateway Mall, it intersects I-105, providing freeway access to downtown Eugene, and OR 126. At the north end of Eugene, intersects Beltline Road in a partial cloverleaf interchange with direct ramps to the western freeway, which carries OR 569 around Eugene.

The freeway leaves Eugene after crossing the McKenzie River at Armitage Park south of Coburg. I-5 continues north along OR 99E through rural Linn County, intersecting OR 228 near Brownsville and OR 34 west of Lebanon, before the two highways reach Albany. The freeway skirts the east side of the city, where it intersects US 20, and begins a concurrency with OR 99E. I-5 and OR 99E then intersect the south and north ends of OR 164 near Millersburg and the Ankeny National Wildlife Refuge. The freeway continues northeast and passes the Enchanted Forest amusement park and several wineries before reaching the southern outskirts of Salem.

The freeway travels around McNary Field and intersects OR 22 at Mission Street, near the Corban University campus southeast of downtown Salem. Between the Willamette Town Center shopping mall and the Oregon State Fairgrounds, the freeway intersects the south end of OR 213, a local highway that parallels I-5 to the east towards the Portland area. OR 99E splits from I-5 at an interchange with Portland Road, located west of the Chemeketa Community College campus in Hayesville. The freeway continues northwest into Keizer and intersects Salem Parkway, a divided highway carrying OR 99E Business, at an interchange that straddles the 45th parallel (marked with a sign in the median).

I-5 continues northeast from the interchange, passing the Keizer Station complex and the minor-league Volcanoes Stadium before leaving the suburban fringes of Keizer. The freeway continues north along OR 99E and the former Oregon Electric Railway, passing the Powerland Heritage Park and Oregon Electric Railway Museum near Brooks. At the Woodburn Premium Outlets mall west of Woodburn, I-5 intersects the dual termini of OR 214 and OR 219, which provide access to Silverton and Newberg, respectively. It reaches a junction with OR 551 north of Aurora State Airport and adjacent to the French Prairie rest area, which includes a  solar power array with 7,000 panels. North of the interchange, I-5 crosses the Willamette River on the Boone Bridge and enters the city of Wilsonville, at the edge of the Portland metropolitan area.

Portland area

The highway bisects downtown Wilsonville and its adjacent suburban neighborhoods, continuing north along the WES Commuter Rail line into Tualatin. On the south side of the city, I-5 intersects the south end of I-205, a bypass of Portland serving Oregon City and eastern Portland. The freeway crosses over the Tualatin River into Durham, where it passes the Bridgeport Village shopping center, before entering Tigard and an intersection with OR 217, a major freeway that connects to Beaverton. I-5 then enters Multnomah County and the city of Portland, where it travels around Mount Sylvania and through a meandering course along Barbur Boulevard (part of OR 99W) across several hilltops. The area averaged about 100 collisions and crashes per year between 1995 and 2005.

I-5 continues north from the Terwilliger curves through South Portland, running uphill from OR 43 on the western bank of the Willamette River and downhill from Barbur Boulevard (now carrying OR 10 and OR 99W). The freeway dives northeasterly towards the South Waterfront district to avoid Marquam Hill, home of the Oregon Health & Science University campus. The lanes of OR 43 are split between Hood and Macadam avenues on west and east sides of I-5 as it crosses under the Portland Aerial Tram and Gibbs Street Pedestrian Bridge. The freeway passes under the Ross Island Bridge (part of US 26) and reaches the southern terminus of I-405, which it intersects in a large Y interchange situated over the light rail tracks of the MAX Orange Line and the Portland Streetcar.

From the interchange, I-405 passes through the western part of Downtown Portland and Harbor Drive continues into downtown along the Willamette River waterfront. I-5 continues northeast over the Willamette River on the double-decked Marquam Bridge, with its northbound lanes on the upper deck and southbound lanes carried on the lower deck. The bridge is the busiest crossing in Oregon, with over 140,000 daily vehicles traveling across it, and runs parallel to the Tilikum Crossing transit bridge and Ross Island Bridge. The east end of the bridge, adjacent to the Oregon Museum of Science and Industry, has a southbound stub ramp that was built to serve the cancelled Mount Hood Freeway. I-5 descends from the bridge and runs north along the Willamette River, following the eastern bank of the river and the Eastbank Esplanade bicycle and pedestrian trail a few blocks west of OR 99E. The freeway crosses over the east end of the Hawthorne Bridge and under the Morrison Bridge, intersecting the latter to provide direct access to Downtown Portland.

After passing under the Burnside Bridge, I-5 intersects the western terminus of I-84, Oregon's lone east–west freeway and the main route through the Columbia River Gorge. After the interchange, US 30 joins I-5 in a short concurrency while the freeway travels around major landmarks in the Rose Quarter, including the Oregon Convention Center, the Moda Center, and the Veterans Memorial Coliseum. At Northeast Holladay Street, the highway passes directly over the MAX Light Rail platforms of the Rose Quarter Transit Center just east of the Steel Bridge, which carries four MAX lines and OR 99W into Downtown Portland. I-5 veers northwest and briefly into a sunken section near the Broadway Bridge, which carries the Portland Streetcar's loop lines. Between the Boise and Eliot neighborhoods, the freeway intersects the terminating I-405 a short distance from the Fremont Bridge, which carries US 30 west into the Pearl District after it splits from I-5. The interchange, located between the Legacy Emanuel Medical Center and Albina railyard, has a set of three stub ramps that were built for the cancelled Rose City Freeway and were re-purposed to serve the hospital.

Through most of North Portland, I-5 runs in a trench that is crossed by several local streets and pedestrian overpasses, connecting Interstate Avenue to the west and Albina Avenue to the east. Interstate Avenue, a part of OR 99W, also carries the MAX Yellow Line through the Overlook, Arbor Lodge, and Kenton neighborhoods. I-5 continues north and passes Peninsula Park and the Cascade campus of the Portland Community College in the Piedmont neighborhood before reaching an interchange with Lombard Street, which carries the US 30 Bypass. From the Lombard Street interchange, the freeway turns northwest and crosses over the Columbia Slough, reaching Delta Park on the site of the former city of Vanport. The area also includes the Portland International Raceway and Portland Meadows horse racing track, along with several sports fields. At the north end of Delta Park, I-5 intersects the north end of OR 99E and the east end of OR 120, a short local route connecting to the Portland Expo Center (where the MAX Yellow Line terminates) and St. Johns. The freeway continues north onto Hayden Island, where a single exit serves the entire island, and crosses over the Columbia River on the Interstate Bridge into Vancouver, Washington. The Interstate Bridge carries a daily average of 132,000 vehicles and consists of two bridges that lift vertically for river traffic.

History

Predecessor trails and highways

I-5 roughly follows the Siskiyou Trail, an early trading route used by indigenous Oregonians and early trappers between the Willamette Valley and California. The trail was re-purposed as a settler's route in 1846, following the creation of the Applegate Trail by the territorial government. It was later incorporated into the early roads of the Willamette Valley, but remained secondary to waterborne transportation along the river and railroads built in the late 19th century. The rising popularity of automobiles at the turn of the century spurred the construction of new highways and the formation of automobile clubs and good roads associations.

The Pacific Highway Association was formed in 1910 to bolster an ongoing campaign to build a highway along the West Coast, from Tijuana to Vancouver, British Columbia. The highway was incorporated into a state highway plan adopted by the Oregon State Highway Commission in 1914, a year after the state legislature had established the commission and a state highway department. The first sections of the  Pacific Highway were initially built by counties through bond issues and other revenue streams. Jackson County was the first to begin construction on its section of the highway, breaking ground on a link between Siskiyou Summit and Medford on November 28, 1913. These early sections were built using compacted dirt, which turned into mud in inclement weather and rendered them impassible. The state government enacted its own revenue sources for highway construction at the end of the decade, including the first state gas tax to be levied in the United States. The Pacific Highway was completed in 1922 and was the first highway to be completely paved from border to border within a state west of the Mississippi River.

Freeway construction

The Oregon state legislature authorized the construction of controlled-access "throughways" (now called freeways) in 1947 and the Pacific Highway was designated as a future corridor the following year. A six-cent gas tax increase was approved by the legislature in 1949 and would be used to improve sections of US 99 to freeway standards. It would later be augmented by federal funding under the Interstate Highways program. The State Highway Commission studied and approved the routing of I-5 around several cities in the late 1950s, including an elevated bypass of Medford.

Although not generally referred as such, the portion of I-5 south of Portland near Tigard to Salem was formerly named the Robert Hugh Baldock Freeway after a former Oregon highway engineer. In 2022, the name was removed from state records following the discovery of his membership in the Ku Klux Klan. Early proposals by engineers put the southern section of I-5 further east through Klamath Falls and the flatter Klamath Basin, but the Siskiyou Pass route was favored by local politicians. Most of the highway in the Pacific Northwest was incorporated into U.S. Route 99 (US 99), created as part of a national highway system in 1926. The Oregon section was divided between Junction City and Portland into US 99W and US 99E, with the latter taking the original route of the Pacific Highway. It was completed on December 1, 1961, with direct connections to Harbor Drive in Downtown Portland.

The first modern rest area in Oregon was opened in 1962 between Eugene and Albany; within four years, eight more sets were completed. The first section of the East Bank Freeway in Portland, running  from the Morrison Bridge to Shaver and Failing streets, opened to traffic on January 7, 1964. The Marquam Bridge, which connected the completed portions of I-5 to the East Bank Freeway, opened to southbound traffic on October 4, 1966, and northbound traffic two weeks later. Its design was criticized by the public and the Portland Art Commission, who described it as "so gross, so lacking in grace, so utterly inconsistent with any concept of aesthetics" in a formal complaint.

The final section of Interstate 5 was dedicated on October 22, 1966, at the Cow Creek rest area. At the time, the freeway had 114 interchanges and 467 bridge structures; it cost an estimated $298 million to construct.

Later history

The Salem–Portland section of I-5 was widened to six lanes in the late 1970s and early 1980s.

In 2022, ODOT completed an emergency onramp at Mountain Avenue in Ashland to aid in evacuations in the event of a wildfire. The gravel ramp is controlled by a locked gate and was approved for construction following the 2020 Almeda fire, which started in the area and destroyed 2,500 homes.

Future projects

The states of Oregon and Washington began planning of a replacement for the twin spans of the Interstate Bridge in the late 1990s to address regional congestion and disruptions due to the lift span. The Columbia River Crossing program was established in 2004 to design a replacement, which was to be 17 lanes wide over Hayden Island and cost up to $3.5 billion. The program was cancelled in 2013 due to opposition within the Washington state legislature; $200 million had been spent during planning, which included federal funds that would need to be reimbursed unless a new proposal was submitted. A new program, named the Interstate Bridge Replacement, began in 2019 and is expected to publish an environmental impact statement in 2023. The updated design would include an eight-lane toll bridge, a multi-use trail for cyclists and pedestrians, and a MAX Light Rail extension into Vancouver. The bridge replacement is expected to cost up to $2.45 billion, while the entire program—including reconstruction of several interchanges and transit improvements—is estimated to cost $5.5 billion to $7.5 billion and would begin construction in 2025.

Exit list

References

External links

05
Oregon
U.S. Route 99
Willamette Valley
Transportation in Washington County, Oregon
Transportation in Marion County, Oregon
Transportation in Josephine County, Oregon
Transportation in Clackamas County, Oregon
Transportation in Lane County, Oregon
Transportation in Jackson County, Oregon
Transportation in Multnomah County, Oregon
Transportation in Linn County, Oregon
Transportation in Douglas County, Oregon